Chess Moves is a 1985 music video compilation for the musical Chess directed by David G. Hillier.

Overview
Chess Moves features five music videos of songs from the original Chess concept album.  Chess lyricist Tim Rice provides introductions for each video.

Cast
The American – Murray Head
Florence – Elaine Paige
The Arbiter – Björn Skifs
Svetlana – Barbara Dickson

Videos
 "One Night in Bangkok" – The American
 "The Arbiter" – The Arbiter  
 "Nobody's Side" – Florence
 "I Know Him So Well" – Florence and Svetlana
 "Pity the Child" – The American

References

External links

1985 video albums
Music video compilation albums
1985 compilation albums